Magic Neighbor is an album by musician Lisa Germano. It was released in 2009 through Young God Records. It peaked at #6 on Billboard's New Age Albums chart.

Track listing
All tracks composed by Lisa Germano; except where indicated
 "Marypan"
 "To the Mighty One"
 "Simple"
 "Kitty Train"
 "The Prince of Plati"
 "A Million Times"
 "Magic Neighbor"
 "Suli-Mon"
 "Snow"
 "Painting the Doors" (Germano, Harold Budd)
 "Cocoon"

Personnel
Sebastian Steinberg - baritone guitar, mandolin, bass
Greg Leisz - pedal steel

References

Lisa Germano albums
2009 albums
Young God Records albums